Adinkra are symbols from Ghana that represent concepts or aphorisms. Adinkra are used extensively in fabrics, logos and pottery. They are incorporated into walls and other architectural features. Adinkra symbols appear on some traditional Akan goldweights. The symbols are also carved on stools for domestic and ritual use. Tourism has led to new departures in the use of the symbols in items such as T-shirts and jewellery.

The symbols have a decorative function but also represent objects that encapsulate evocative messages conveying traditional wisdom, aspects of life, or the environment. There are many symbols with distinct meanings, often linked with proverbs. In the words of Kwame Anthony Appiah, they were one of the means for "supporting the transmission of a complex and nuanced body of practice and belief".

History 

Adinkra symbols were originally created by the Bono people of Gyaman. The Gyaman king, Nana Kwadwo Agyemang Adinkra, originally created or designed these symbols, naming it after himself. The Adinkra symbols were largely used on pottery, stools etc. by the people of Bono. Adinkra cloth was worn by the king of Gyaman, and its usage spread from Bono Gyaman to Asante and other Akan kingdoms following its defeat. It is said that the guild designers who designed this cloth for the Kings were forced to teach the Asantes the craft. Gyaman king Nana Kwadwo Agyemang Adinkra's first son, Apau, who was said to be well versed in the Adinkra craft, was forced to teach more about Adinkra cloths. Oral accounts have attested to the fact that Adinkra Apau taught the process to a man named Kwaku Dwaku in a town near Kumasi. Over time, all Akan people including the Fante, Akuapem and Akyem all made Adinkra symbols a major part of their culture, as they all originated from the ancient Bono Kingdom.

The oldest surviving adinkra cloth was made in 1817. The cloth features 15 stamped symbols, including nsroma (stars), dono ntoasuo (double Dono drums), and diamonds. The patterns were printed using carved calabash stamps and a vegetable-based dye. It has resided in the British Museum since 1818, when it was donated by Thomas E. Bowdich.

The next oldest piece of adinkra textile was sent in 1825 from the Elmina Castle to the royal cabinet of curiosities in The Hague, in response to an assignment from Major Friedrich Last, who was appointed temporary Commander of Dutch Gold Coast. He had the cloth commissioned from the Fante paramount chief of Elmina for William I of the Netherlands, which would explain why the coat of arms of the Netherlands is in the centre. The other motifs are typical of the older adinkras. It is now on display in the National Museum of Ethnology in Leiden.

In November 2020, a school board in York, Pennsylvania, banned "a children's coloring book that featured African Adrinkra [sic] symbols found in fabrics, logos and pottery." The decision was subsequently overturned.

Adinkra cloth
In Akan (Twi), the term adinkra refers to not symbols, but a particular type of cloth. Adinkra cloths were traditionally only worn by royalty and spiritual leaders for funerals and other very special occasions. In the past they were hand-printed on undyed, red, dark brown or black hand-woven natural cotton fabric depending on the occasion and the wearer's role; nowadays they are frequently mass-produced on brighter coloured fabrics.

The present centre of traditional production of adinkra cloth is from Ghana, Ntɔnso, 20 km northwest of Kumasi and in Ivory Coast. Dark Adinkra aduro pigment for the stamping is made there, by soaking, pulverizing, and boiling the inner bark and roots of the badie tree (Bridelia ferruginea) in water over a wood fire. Once the dark colour is released, the mixture is strained, and then boiled for several more hours until it thickens. The stamps are carved out of the bottom of a calabash piece. They measure between five and eight centimetres square. They have a handle on the back, and the stamp itself is slightly curved so that the dye can be put on with a rocking motion.

Sample of symbols listed 
Recorded sample of 53 adinkra symbols and their meanings

Notes

Further reading
 The Adinkra dictionary: A visual primer on the language of Adinkra  by W. Bruce Willis. 
 Cloth as Metaphor: (re)reading the Adinkra cloth symbols of the Akan of Ghana by Dr George F. Kojo Arthur.  Legon, Ghana: Centre for Indigenous Knowledge Systems, 2001. 187 [6], p. 29 cm. 
 African Accents: Fabrics and Crafts to Decorate Your Home by Lisa Shepard. 
 Adinkra Symbols: To say good bye to a dead relative or friend by Matthew Bulgin
 Adinkra: An Epitome of Asante Philosophy and History by Dickson Adome, Erik Appau Asante, Steve Kquofi

External links 

 Adinkra Symbols
 Adinkra Symbols of West Africa
 Adinkra Symbols at About.com
 ADINKRA - Cultural Symbols of the Asante people
 Adinkra Symbols
 Black Renaissance Man/Adinkra Symbols
 Adinkra Stamps and their Meanings
 Akan Cultural Symbols Project
 Adinkra Symbols Library Project
 Adinkra in Ntonso-Ashanti, Ghana
 Adrinkra symbols and meanings in Spanish.  Africanidad.com

Akan language
Ashanti people
Ashanti Region
Ghanaian culture
Proto-writing
Symbols
Textile patterns
Visual motifs
Writing systems of Africa